The 19th Finswimming World Championships was held in Volos, Greece at the Swimming Pool Neas Ionias “Vasilis Polymeros” from 24 to 28 July 2016.

Medal overview

Men's events

 Swimmers who participated in the heats only and received medals.

Women's events

 Swimmers who participated in the heats only and received medals.

Mixed events

Medal table
 Host nation

References

External links
Official website
Results

Finswimming World Championships
International sports competitions hosted by Greece
Finswimming World Championships
Sport in Volos
Finswimming World Championships